Edward Webb (c. 1666 – 1718) was a Colonial American silversmith, born in England but active in Boston. He apprenticed from 1680 until 1687 to William Denny, a London goldsmith, and may have been in Boston as early as 1704, but definitely by 1709. His work is collected in the Five Colleges Art Museums, Metropolitan Museum of Art, Museum of Fine Arts, Boston, and Yale University Art Gallery.

References 
 Chocolate: History, Culture, and Heritage, Louis E. Grivetti, Howard-Yana Shapiro, John Wiley & Sons, 2011. .
 Colonial Massachusetts Silversmiths and Jewelers, Patricia E. Kane, Yale University Art Gallery, 1998, page 956.
 Five Colleges Art Museums spoon
 Metropolitan Museum of Art spoon
 Yale University Art Gallery tankard

1718 deaths
American silversmiths
English silversmiths
Year of birth uncertain